In mathematics, the Hawaiian earring  is the topological space defined by the union of circles in the Euclidean plane  with center  and radius  for  endowed with the subspace topology:

The space  is homeomorphic to the one-point compactification of the union of a countable family of disjoint open intervals.

The Hawaiian earring is a one-dimensional, compact, locally path-connected metrizable space. Therefore,  does not have a simply connected covering space and is usually given as the simplest example of a space with this complication.

The Hawaiian earring looks very similar to the wedge sum of countably infinitely many circles; that is, the rose with infinitely many petals, but these two spaces are not homeomorphic.  The difference between their topologies is seen in the fact that, in the Hawaiian earring, every open neighborhood of the point of intersection of the circles contains all but finitely many of the circles (an -ball around  contains every circle whose radius is less than ); in the rose, a neighborhood of the intersection point might not fully contain any of the circles. Additionally, the rose is not compact: the complement of the distinguished point is an infinite union of open intervals; to those add a small open neighborhood of the distinguished point to get an open cover with no finite subcover.

Fundamental group 

The Hawaiian earring is neither simply connected nor semilocally simply connected since, for all  the loop  parameterizing the th circle is not homotopic to a trivial loop. Thus,  has a nontrivial fundamental group   sometimes referred to as the Hawaiian earring group. The Hawaiian earring group  is uncountable, and it is not a free group.

The uncountably many other elements of  arise from loops whose image is not contained in finitely many of the Hawaiian earring's circles; in fact, some of them are surjective. For example, the path that on the interval  circumnavigates the th circle. More generally, one may form infinite products of the loops  indexed over any countable linear order provided that for each , the loop  and its inverse appear within the product only finitely many times.

However,  is a proper subgroup of the inverse limit since each loop in  may traverse each circle of  only finitely many times.

First singular homology 

The first summand  is the direct product of infinitely many copies of the infinite cyclic group (the Baer–Specker group).

Higher dimensions 

The Hawaiian earring can be generalized to higher dimensions.  Such a generalization was used by Michael Barratt and John Milnor to provide examples of compact, finite-dimensional spaces with nontrivial singular homology groups in dimensions larger than that of the space.  The -dimensional Hawaiian earring is defined as

 

Hence,  is a  countable union of -spheres which have one single point in common, and the topology is given by a metric in which the sphere's diameters converge to zero as  Alternatively,  may be constructed as the Alexandrov compactification of a countable union of disjoint s.

For , the -dimensional Hawaiian earring is a compact, -connected and locally -connected. For , it is known that  is isomorphic to the Baer–Specker group 

For  and  Barratt and Milnor showed that the singular homology group  is a nontrivial uncountable group for each such .

See also 
 List of topologies

References

Further reading
.
.
.
.
.
.

Topological spaces